Pahrump Valley is a Mojave Desert valley west of Las Vegas and the Spring Mountains massif in southern Nye County, Nevada, and eastern San Bernardino County, California. Pahrump, Nevada, is in the valley's center and the Tecopa and Chicago Valleys are immediately to the west. The valley has routes to Death Valley and a route to Las Vegas.
Pahrump Valley Days  is the annual event in February each year, along with the sanctioned JRH-HS Rodeo.

History
The Pahrump Valley was crossed by the Old Spanish Trail and later the Salt Lake Road.

Geography
The large block of the Spring Mountains borders Pahrump Valley on the northeast and east, with Nevada State Route 160 skirting parts of the mountain's south, and being the only due west route from Las Vegas. Route 160 turns northwest to Pahrump in the valley's center-north then meets U.S. Route 95 at the valley's north perimeter. Carpenter Canyon road starts near Pahrump and runs about 10 miles to Carpenter Canyon. Carpenter Canyon creek is one of the few year round fish creeks in the Spring Mountains.

In California, the Nopah Range borders the valley's southwest, with the north of the adjacent Resting Spring Range merging north to form the northwest border of the Pahrump Valley. The mostly east-west Kingston Range is the southern border of the valley.

The closest community to Pahrump is Shoshone, California, 25 mi southwest, with Ash Meadows Ranch and Death Valley Junction, California slightly farther to the northwest.

Pahrump Valley Wilderness
The Pahrump Valley Wilderness is in the southern valley, the northern Kingston Range, and the California and Mesquite Valleys.

References

Further reading

External links
 

Valleys of the Mojave Desert
Valleys of California
Valleys of Nevada
Valleys of Nye County, Nevada
Valleys of San Bernardino County, California
Old Spanish Trail (trade route)